Berevoești is a commune in Argeș County, Muntenia, Romania. It is composed of four villages: Berevoești, Bratia, Gămăcești and Oțelu.

The Bratia River passes through the Gămăcești and Bratia villages.

References

Communes in Argeș County
Localities in Muntenia